VCE may refer to:

Education
 Victorian Certificate of Education, a senior secondary school qualification in Victoria, Australia
 Vocational Certificate of Education, a further education qualification in the United Kingdom
 Vaagdevi College of Engineering, a college in Telangana, India

Technology
 Virtual Computing Environment, a former division of EMC Corporation originally created in collaboration with Cisco Systems
 Video Coding Engine, a video data processing hardware component
 Variable cycle engine, an aircraft thrust engine type

Other uses
 Venice Marco Polo Airport, Italy, by IATA airport code
 Videocapsule endoscopy
 Virtual customer environment, a web-based forum